Fist Power is a 2000 Hong Kong action film directed by Aman Chang, starring Chiu Man-cheuk, Anthony Wong, Gigi Lai and Sam Lee. Shooting for the film took place in Hong Kong between February and March 1999. The film was released in Hong Kong theatres on 21 January 2000.

Plot
Brian Cheuk, a security specialist and martial arts teacher, visits his family in Hong Kong and helps to send his nephew to school.

Shortly after that, Charles, a disgruntled former British marine, takes the students hostage and plants bombs around the school. Charles is unhappy because his son was taken away by his ex-wife and her current husband, who are going to leave Hong Kong for the United States. He demands that his son be brought to him in exchange for the hostages.

Cheuk agrees to bring Charles's son to him. With help from Simna, Charles's brother-in-law, and Hung, a reporter, he rushes to the airport to find Charles's son.

Even after they find the boy, all is not over yet because their return journey is filled with danger. Both the police and the thugs – including a hired killer – are out to get them.

Cast
 Chiu Man-cheuk as Brian Cheuk
 Anthony Wong as Charles Chau
 Gigi Lai as Hung
 Sam Lee as Simna
 Cheng Pei-pei as Brian's mother
 Lau Kar-wing as Brian's father
 Kara Hui as Brian's sister
 Lung Fong as Chiu Chung-tin
 Jewel Lee as Killer
 Mak King-ting as Charles Chau's ex-wife
 Wai Tin-chi as Killer
 Mak Tak-law as Killer
 Lam Suet as Fatty
 Jude Poyer as Foreign Killer
 Wu Chi-lung as Brian Cheuk's brother-in-law

Home media
On 19 March 2001, the DVD was released by Mia in the United Kingdom in Region 2. The DVD was released in Region 1 in the United States on 16 October 2001, it was distributed by Tai Seng.

See also
 List of Hong Kong films

References

External links
 
 

2000 films
2000 action films
2000s Cantonese-language films
China Star Entertainment Group films
Films directed by Aman Chang
Films set in Hong Kong
Hong Kong action films
Kung fu films
2000s Hong Kong films